Jack Greenlees is a Scottish actor, known for his roles as Craig Cooper in the BBC One Scottish crime drama television series Shetland (2016), as Justice Stuart Knox in the British-American period drama television series Harlots (2019) and as Paul Mann in the BBC One television series The Trial of Christine Keeler (2019–2020).

Filmography

Film

Television

Stage

References

External links
 

21st-century Scottish male actors
Living people
Scottish male film actors
Scottish male television actors
Year of birth missing (living people)